The 1973 UC Davis Aggies football team represented the University of California, Davis as a member of the Far Western Conference (FWC) during the 1973 NCAA Division II football season. Led by fourth-year head coach Jim Sochor, UC Davis compiled an overall record of 7–3 with a mark of 4–1 in conference play, sharing the FWC title with Chico State and finishing at champions for the third consecutive season. 1973 was the fourth consecutive winning season for the Aggies. The team outscored its opponents 217 to 153 for the season. The Aggies played home games at Toomey Field in Davis, California.

Schedule

References

UC Davis
UC Davis Aggies football seasons
Northern California Athletic Conference football champion seasons
UC Davis Aggies football